Kathryn Michelle "Katy" Kinard (born September 16, 1980) is an American Christian musician and pianist, who primarily plays a style of contemporary worship music and Christian pop music. She has released four musical works, Headed Back (2005), You're Still Better (2007), Lullaby Hymns (2010), and God of Fireflies (2016).

Early life
Kinard was born, Kathryn Michelle Kinard, on September 16, 1980, in Dallas, Texas, to father Terry Mac Kinard and mother Shelley Nichols Hudson, where she was raised with an older sister, Kristi. They moved to Colorado, when she was twelve years-old, eventually relocating to Nashville, Tennessee, and graduating from Belmont University.

Music career
Her music recording career started in 2005, with the studio album, Headed Back, that released on February 8, 2005. While her second studio album, You're Still Better, was released on April 5, 2007. The third studio album, Lullaby Hymns: The Weary Soul, was released on June 20, 2010. She released God of Fireflies on July 8, 2016.

Discography
Headed Back (February 8, 2005)
You're Still Better (April 5, 2007)
Lullaby Hymns: The Weary Soul (June 20, 2010)
God of Fireflies (July 8, 2016)

References

External links
 

1980 births
Living people
American performers of Christian music
Musicians from Dallas
Musicians from Nashville, Tennessee
Songwriters from Colorado
Songwriters from Texas
Songwriters from Tennessee
Belmont University alumni